Lynn Silliman (born April 24, 1959) is an American rower who competed in the 1976 Summer Olympics.

She was born in Watsonville, California in 1959. In 1976 she was the coxswain of the American boat that won the bronze medal in the eight event.

References 

1959 births
Living people
American female rowers
Coxswains (rowing)
Rowers at the 1976 Summer Olympics
Olympic bronze medalists for the United States in rowing
People from Watsonville, California
Medalists at the 1976 Summer Olympics
World Rowing Championships medalists for the United States
21st-century American women